Pari Khan Khanum (also spelled Parikhan Khanum; 1548–12 February 1578, aged 29) was a Safavid princess, the daughter of the Safavid king (shah) Tahmasp I ( 1524 – 1576) and his Circassian consort, Sultan-Agha Khanum. An influential figure in the Safavid state, Pari Khan Khanum was well educated and knowledgeable in traditional Islamic sciences such as jurisprudence, and was an accomplished poet.

She played a crucial role in securing the succession of her brother Ismail II (r. 1576–1577) to the Safavid throne. During Ismail's brief reign, her influence lessened, but then increased during the reign of Ismail's successor, Mohammad Khodabanda (r. 1578–1587), even becoming the de facto ruler of the Safavid state for a short period. She was strangled to death on 12February 1578 at Qazvin because her influence and power were perceived as dangerous by the Qizilbash.

Biography

Youth
Pari Khan Khanum was the second daughter of the Safavid shah TahmaspI by his Circassian wife Sultan-Agha Khanum in August 1548 at Ahar. When Tahmasp's brother Bahram Mirza Safavi died in 1549, he looked out after the latter's children, even proclaiming one of them—prince Badi-al Zaman Mirza Safavi—as his own son. He appointed him as the governor of Sistan in 1557, and offered Pari Khan Khanum's (who was at that time 10 years old) hand in marriage, which he accepted. However, she was forbidden to go to Sistan by her, due to her being his favourite daughter. Historians including Shoreh Gholsorki, author of a 1995 study of Pari Khan Khanum, believe that she was only engaged to Badi al-Zaman and that no marriage took place, since Pari Khan Khanum chose a bureaucratic life in the capital alongside her father over married life in Sistan.

Succession disputes

Pari Khan Khanum's participation in the affairs of the Safavid state started during the last years of Tahmasp's reign. Disenchanted with the bureaucratic life, her father granted her the authority and legal status that provided the basis for her later rise to power. Pari Khan Khanum, who virtually ruled Iran during the last years of her father’s reign and played a key role in the rise to power of her brother Ismail Mirza.

On 18 October 1574 Tahmasp became ill and twice came close to dying without having chosen a successor. Pari Khan Khanum took care of him during his illness, bringing them even closer. Simultaneously, the main chieftains of the Qizilbash arranged a meeting to discuss who should be the successor. The Ustalju clan and the Shaykhavand clan (which was related to the Safavid family) favored Tahmasp's son Haydar Mirza Safavi. The Georgians also supported him since his mother was Georgian.

The Rumlu, Afshar, and the Qajar clan favored Ismail Mirza Safavi, Haydar's older brother, who was jailed in the Qahqaheh Castle. Pari Khan Khanum also favored Ismail Mirza, and she had the support of the Circassians. While Tahmasp was still sick, supporters of Haydar Mirza sent a message to the Khalifa Ansar Qaradghlu, castellan of Qahqaheh Castle, and requested that he have Ismail Mirza killed. However, Pari Khan Khanum uncovered the plot and told Tahmasp about it. Due to still having some love for his son, Tahmasp had a party of Afshar musketeers sent to the castle to guard Ismail Mirza. He soon recuperated from his illness, but died two years later, on 14May 1576, in Qazvin. Haydar Mirza was the only son who was with Tahmasp when he died. The following day, he announced himself as the new shah. Normally, some Qizilbash men would guard the royal palace and take turns serving guard with other others. Unfortunately for Haydar Mirza, on that day all the Qizilbash guards were from the Rumlu, Afshar, Qajar, Bayat, or the Dorsaq tribesall loyal supporters of Ismail Mirza.

Haydar Mirza soon realized vulnerable position that he was entangled in, and in order to ensure his own safety, put Pari Khan Khanum under arrest. She pleaded to Haydar Mirza, attempting to convince him of her loyalty by that proclaiming that she was the first to acknowledge his rule by prostrating herself before him: she vowed that she would attempt to convince Ismail Mirza's supporters (including her full brother Suleiman Mirza and her Circassian uncle Shamkhal Sultan) to desert him. Haydar Mirza accepted her request, and gave her permission to leave the palace, but she betrayed him and gave Shamkhal Sultan the keys to the palace gate. Haydar Mirza's supporters hurried to his palace to save him, but the palace guards, who still disliked Haydar Mirza even after he had tried to win them to his side by declaring several assurances, closed the gates, while Ismail Mirza's supporters entered the palace and went to its inner part. Haydar Mirza's supporters managed to break through the gate, but did not reach there in timeIsmail Mirza's supporters discovered Haydar Mirza, dressed as a woman in the royal harem, and beheaded him. His bloody head was then thrown down to Haydar Mirza's supporters, who gave in and thus allowed Ismail Mirza to ascend the throne as IsmailII.

De facto ruler of the Safavid realm

Under Ismail II

During the dynastic struggle between Haydar Mirza and Ismail Mirza, Pari Khan Khanum became the de facto ruler of the state; it was she who ordered all the princes and top-ranking members of the realm to gather at Qazvin's main mosque on 23May 1576, where the distinguished cleric Mir Makhdum Sharifi Shirazi read the khotba in the name of Ismail Mirza, confirming him as the new shah of the Safavid dynasty.

Ismail Mirza, who was still in the Qahqaheh Castle, was soon escorted out of the place with thousands of Qizilbash warriors, reaching the outskirts of Qazvin on 4June 1576. In the course of the 31 days following the death of Tahmasp, the henchmen and chieftains of the Qizilbash clans had visited the palace of Pari Khan Khanum every day and, according to Iskandar Beg Munshi, "informed her of the urgent business of the realm be it fiscal or financial or to do with politics of the day and nobody had any inclination or dared to disobey her command".

After entering Qazvin, Ismail Mirza did not advance to the regal palace directly since the astrologists had stated that the time was ominous. He thus stayed for 14 days at the house of Husaynquli Khulafa, the leader of the Rumlu clan and the Khalifat al-Khulafa (administrator of Sufi affairs). Although Ismail Mirza held the title of shah, the majority of the Qizilbash officers and high-ranking statesmen continued to visit Pari Khan Khanum's palace. At the same time, Pari Khan Khanum had managed to organize a remarkable court for herself "where her attendants and ladies-in-waiting acted as if they were serving at a proper royal court".

Ismail Mirza ascended to the crown under the dynastic name of IsmailII on 22August 1576. His 19 years of imprisonment in the Qahqaheh castle had greatly affected him, and he was not inclined to allow displays of authority by any other individual. He announced that it was prohibited for Qizilbash chieftains, officers, and high-ranking officials to enter Pari Khan Khanum's palace. He dissolved the duties of her wardens and her court servants and seized an extensive collection of properties belonging to her. Moreover, he displayed a cold and non-approachable behaviour towards her when he allowed her an audience.

Ismail II's lack of gratitude toward Pari Khan Khanum, who had fought so hard to make him shah of the Safavid dynasty, made her feel hostile towards him, and motivated her to exact vengeance. On 25November 1577 IsmailII died abruptly and without any initial signs of bad health. The court doctors, who checked the corpse, surmised that he may have died from poison. The general agreement was that Pari Khan Khanum had resolved to have him poisoned with the help of the mistresses of the inner harem in retaliation for his bad behaviour towards her. With IsmailII out of the way, Pari Khan Khanum regained her authority and control. State grandees, clan chieftains, officers, and officials carried out the orders delivered by her deputies and served according to her word.

Alarmed that the announcement of IsmailII's death would start discontent in the capital, the aristocracy kept the doors of the palace locked until a decision was reached regarding the succession. According to some accounts, after IsmailII's death a group of statesmen asked Pari Khan Khanum to succeed her brother, which offer she apparently declined.

In order to clear up the succession crisis, the Qizilbash chieftains agreed to appoint the future shah after consulting with each other and then notifying Pari Khan Khanum of their choice. At first they discussed the resolution that Shoja al-Din Mohammad Safavi, the eight-month-old infant son of IsmailII, should be crowned as shah while in reality state affairs would be taken care of by Pari Khan Khanum. This suggestion, however, did not obtain the approval of most of the assembly since it would have swayed the balance of power among many Qizilbash clans. Ultimately the assembly agreed to appoint Mohammad Khodabanda, the elder brother of IsmailII, as shah.

Under Mohammad Khodabanda

The appointment of Mohammad Khodabanda was supported and approved by Pari Khan Khanum, due to him being a pleasure-seeking, nearly blind man of old age. Since he was the approved successor, Pari Khan Khanum could take advantage of his weakness and rule herself. She made an agreement with the Qizilbash chieftains that Mohammad Khodabanda would remain shah in name, while she and her envoys would continue directing the interests of the state.

When Mohammad Khodabanda was crowned shah, the Safavid aristocracy, officers, and provincial governors wanted approval from Pari Khan Khanum to give him a congratulating visit. Pari Khan Khanum's sphere of influence and authority was so enormous that no one had the courage to visit Shiraz without her unambiguous approval. The very day that Mohammad Khodabanda was made shah, his wife Khayr al-Nisa Begum, who was better known by her title of Mahd-e Olya, took control of his affairs. She was mindful of her husband's shortcomings, and to make up for it she resolved to try to become the practical ruler of the Safavid state.

On 12 February 1578, Mohammad Khodabanda and Mah-e Olya entered the outskirts of Qazvin. This marked the conclusion of the incontestable rule that Pari Khan Khanum had enjoyed for two months and 20 days. Although she was still the practical ruler of the state and with the arrival of her brother, her authority did not change, and officers and high-ranking officials continue to accept her orders, she would now meet opposition from Mahd-e Olya and her allies. When they reached the city, Pari Khan Khanum gladly received them with great grandeur and a parade, sitting in a golden-spun litter, while being guarded by 4,000–5,000 guards, inner-harem personal assistants, and court attendants.

Death
During her stay in Qazvin, Mahd-e Olya was informed of the great influence and power held by Pari Khan Khanum, thus affirming what she had already been told by Mirza Salman Jaberi, the former grand vizier of IsmailII. It was made clear to her as long as Pari Khan Khanum was alive, she would not be able to establish her authority in country and became its virtual leader. She thus began planning to have her killed.

The order was executed on 12 February 1578 by Khalil Khan Afshar, who had served as Pari Khan Khanum's tutor during the reign of Tahmasp. While Pari Khan Khanum was enroute to her home with her servants, Khalil Khan Afshar appeared with his men and a fight ensued. Pari Khan Khanum was eventually seized and taken to his home, where he had her strangled to death. Her uncle, Shamkhal Sultan, was executed shortly afterward, and IsmailII's son Shoja al-Din Mohammad Safavi was murdered.

References

Sources 

 
 
 
 
 
 
 
 
 
 
 
 

Safavid princesses
Iranian people of Circassian descent
People from Ahar
1548 births
1578 deaths
16th-century Iranian women
16th-century people of Safavid Iran